Ludovic Soares (born 8 May 1994) is a professional footballer who plays as a left-back for Slavia Sofia. Born in France, he plays for the Cape Verde national team.

Career
Soares joined Évian Thonon Gaillard in 2007. He made his senior debut as a late substitute in the first game of the 2015–16 Ligue 2 season, a 0–0 draw against Nîmes. He signed his first professional contract with the club on 8 September 2015.

Released by Évian TG, Soares signed for Red Star on a two-year deal in July 2016.

In July 2017, Soares signed a three-year deal with Clermont Foot.

Soares joined Laval from Clermont in the summer of 2019, he started the 2019–20 season as first choice left-back. He gradually lost his place during the season and suffered from injury. He agreed mutual termination of his contract in January 2021, having made 18 league appearances for the club.

On 12 July 2021, Soares signed a three-year deal with Slavia Sofia.

International career
Soares was born in France, and is of Cape Verdean descent. He debuted with the Cape Verde national team on 23 March 2022, in a 2–0 friendly win over Guadeloupe.

References

1994 births
Living people
People from Thonon-les-Bains
Cape Verdean footballers
Cape Verde international footballers
French footballers
French sportspeople of Cape Verdean descent
Association football fullbacks
Ligue 2 players
Championnat National players
Championnat National 2 players
Thonon Evian Grand Genève F.C. players
Red Star F.C. players
Clermont Foot players
Stade Lavallois players
Sportspeople from Haute-Savoie
Footballers from Auvergne-Rhône-Alpes